Radolfshausen is a Samtgemeinde ("collective municipality") in the district of Göttingen, in Lower Saxony, Germany. It is situated approximately 15 km east of Göttingen. Its seat is in the village Ebergötzen.

The Samtgemeinde Radolfshausen consists of the following municipalities:

 Ebergötzen
 Landolfshausen
 Seeburg
 Seulingen
 Waake

Samtgemeinden in Lower Saxony